is a 1964 Japanese historical drama film directed by Hiroshi Inagaki, with special effects by Eiji Tsuburaya. The film is set during the seventeenth century and is about the aftermath of the Siege of Osaka.

Plot
In the 17th century, after the fall of Osaka to the forces of Shogun Tokugawa Ieyasu several survivors of the Toyotomi clan try to deliver a young prince to safety. They are betrayed by other survivors who want to enrich themselves under the pretext of re-establishing their clan.

Cast
Ichikawa Somegorō VI as Jubei
Yosuke Natsuki as Kyunosuke
Yuriko Hoshi as Princess Kozato
Toshiro Mifune as Lord Akashi
Makoto Satō as the cook 
Akihiko Hirata Ryutaro Inoue
Kumi Mizuno
Mitsuko Kusabue
Yoshiko Kuga
Yoshio Inaba
Ryosuke Kagawa
Sachio Sakai
Akira Kubo

Production 
Director Hiroshi Inagaki and special effects director Eiji Tsuburaya, were both busy with other projects, so they did not discuss from which direction the tornado would appear on the screen, but their directions were the same.

References

External links

1964 films
1960s historical action films
Japanese historical action films
Jidaigeki films
Japanese black-and-white films
1960s Japanese-language films
Films set in Osaka
Films set in the 1610s
Films directed by Hiroshi Inagaki
Films produced by Tomoyuki Tanaka
Films scored by Akira Ifukube
Toho films
1960s Japanese films